VConnect (a product of Mplify Limited) was an online marketplace that helped users hire local professionals for service needs. There were over 100 services listed on Vconnect which ranged from repairs and maintenance, home and office improvement, events and entertainment, personal services, business services and logistics. Vconnect offered services for Nigeria and Ghana.

History 
In 2010, after his inability to find Nigerian local businesses online, Deepankar began to assemble a team that would help collect local SMEs information that can be accessed via a Google-esque local search engine.

He along with his co-founder, Anand Chander Mohan launched Vconnect.com on 8 March 2011. Vconnect was a part of Tolaram Group, which is headquartered in Singapore.

Evolution

Market by Vconnect 
On June 23, 2018, Vconnect officially launched Market by Vconnect, a service marketplace where business owners can find and connect with customers. With this, business owners could find and shop for customers with an option to pay for one customer or pay for a package plan. In conjunction, Vconnect also introduced Take a Pledge,  a system to verify the identity of all businesses registered on Vconnect.

References 

Service companies of Nigeria
Internet search engines
Nigerian brands
Companies based in Lagos
Internet properties established in 2010
Online marketplaces of Nigeria